Gera(s) was an ancient city and former bishopric in Roman Egypt and remains a Latin Catholic titular see.

Its modern location, now in Egypt, is unclear.

History 
Gera(s) was important enough in the Late Roman province of Augustamnica Prima to be one of the suffragans of its capital Pelusium's Metropolitan Archbishopric. It was however to fade completely.

Titular see 
The diocese was nominally restored as a Latin Catholic titular bishopric in the 18th century under the name Gerrha (Gerra in Curiate Italian), which was changed in 1925 to Gera(s).

It is vacant since decades, having had the following incumbents, all of the fitting episcopal (lowest) rank :
 Francisco Juan Leiza (1739.02.23 – 1747.10.24)
 Juan Francisco Manrique Lara (1749.09.22 – 1754.04.01)
 Alfonso Solís Grajera, Military Order of Saint James of the Sword (O.S.) (1757.07.18 – 1783.02.17)
 Fr. Dominicus Castells (1786.07.24 – 1788.07.23)
 Pablo Sitjar Ruata (1797.07.24 – 1808.03.16)
 James Buckley (1819.03.06 – 1828.03.26)
 Francesco Maria Zoppi (1833.04.15 – 1841.04)
 Johannes Zwijsen (1842.01.24 – 1853.03.04) (later Archbishop of Utrecht)
 Alexander Goss (1853.07.29 – 1856.01.25) (later Bishop of Liverpool)
 Daniel McGettigan (1856.02.29 – 1861.05.01) (later Archbishop of Armagh)
 Victor-Joseph Doutreloux (1875.07.05 – 1879.08.26)
 Fedele Abati, Friars Minor (O.F.M.) (1879.09.22 – 1885.01.11)
 Henri-Charles-Camille Lambrecht (1886.03.26 – 1888.06.17) (later Bishop of Ghent)
 João Fernando Santiago Esberard (Esberrard) (1890.06.26 – 1891.05.12) (later Archbishop)
 Constant-Jean-Baptiste Prodhomme, Paris Foreign Missions Society (M.E.P). (1913.06.02 – 1920.08.20)
 Luca Ermenegildo Pasetto, Conventual Franciscans (O.F.M. Cap.) (1921.11.21 – 1937.09.22), as Secretary of Sacred Congregation of Religious (1935 – 1950.11.11), later Titular Archbishop of Iconium (1937.09.22 – 1950.11.11), Latin Titular Patriarch of Alexandria (1950.11.11 – death 1954.01.22)
 Ilarino Felder, O.F.M. Cap. (1938.04.12 – 1951.11.27)
 Jacinto Argaya Goicoechea (1952.08.15 – 1957.09.12)
 John Michael Fearns (1957.11.04 – 1977.07.04)

Source and External links 
 GCatholic, with titular incumbent bio links

Catholic titular sees in Africa